This is a list of timelines currently on Wikipedia.

Overview

There are several types of timeline articles.

Historical timelines show the significant historical events and developments for a specific topic, over the course of centuries or millennia.
 Graphical timelines provide a visual representation for the timespan of multiple events that have a particular duration, over the course of centuries or millennia.
Timelines by year are timelines for one particular year that show the developments for that year within the topical area of that timeline.
 Lists of years or Tables of years are indexes that list all of the individual timelines by year that pertain to a specific topic.

Timespans next to the timeline articles listed here include the date of the earliest item included in the linked timeline article.

Types

General

History

Arts

Biographical

Contemporary culture

Entertainment

Comic books

Crime

Disasters

Economics

Environment

Fictional
The following is a list of fictional timelines.
 Timeline of Star Trek – science fiction television series, later expanded to other media.
 Future History, a list of future events chronicled in much of the science fiction of Robert A. Heinlein, and one of the first fictional timelines published by an author.

Peoples, nations, cultures and geographical

 Timeline of food
 Chronology of colonialism
 Timeline of country and capital changes
 Timeline of maritime migration and exploration
 Timeline of the European migrant crisis

Ancient civilizations

Extant civilizations

Supranational entities and regions, peoples

Sovereign states

Subnational regions and cities, narrow timelines

Health

Law

Military

Military conflicts

Philosophy

Politics

Religion

Ayyavazhi
 Timeline of Ayyavazhi history (1809–present)

Buddhism
 Timeline of Buddhism (563 BCE – present)

Christianity

Hinduism
Timeline of Hinduism
Timeline of Hindu texts

Islam
 Timeline of Islamic history (545–present)
 Timeline of the Muslim presence in the Iberian Peninsula

Jainism
 Timeline of Jainism

Judaism

Sikhism
 Sikh gurus (1469–1666)

Science

The Cosmic Calendar is a method to visualize the chronology of the universe, scaling its current age of 13.8 billion years to a single year in order to help intuit it for pedagogical purposes in science education or popular science.

 Timeline of scientific discoveries (17th century BCE – present)
 Timeline of scientific experiments (240 BCE – present)
 Timeline of the history of scientific method (2000 BCE – 2009 CE)
 Timeline of science and engineering in the Muslim world (610 CE – present)
 Timeline of Polish science and technology (1251 – present)
 Timeline of dendrochronology timestamp events (~10,000 BCE–present)

Anthropology
 Timeline of human development

 Timeline of anthropology (1870–2020)
 Timeline of archaeology (1506 – present)

Astronautics and planetary science

Astronomy, astrophysics, and cosmology

Biology

Chemistry

Environmental sciences
 List of years in the environment and environmental sciences
  in the environment and environmental sciences

Meteorology
 Timeline of meteorology (350 BCE – present)
 Timeline of temperature and pressure measurement technology (9th century CE–present)

Geology and paleontology

Mathematics and statistics

Physiology, medicine, and health

Physics

Psychology
 Timeline of psychology (1550 BCE–present)
 Timeline of coaching psychology (1926–present)
 Timeline of psychotherapy (1550 BCE–present)

Sports

Technology

 History of technology (2.5 Mya–present)
 Timeline of historic inventions (3.3–2.6 Mya–present)
 Timelines of United States inventions and discoveries (1717–2009)
 Timeline of Russian inventions and technology records
 Timeline of sustainable energy research 2020–present
 List of technologies

Communication and information media

Computers and related technology

Everyday necessities
 Timeline of agriculture and food technology (12,000 BCE – present)
 Timeline of clothing and textiles technology (50,000 BCE–1963)

Light and optical instruments
 Timeline of lighting technology (Prehistory–present)
 Timeline of microscope technology (1590–present)
 Timeline of photography technology (1717–present)
 Timeline of telescope technology (antiquity–present)
 Timeline of telescopes, observatories, and observing technology (1000–present)

Measurement
 Timeline of temperature and pressure measurement technology (1450–1930)
 Timeline of time measurement technology (270 BCE–present)

General mechanical engineering
 Timeline of motor and engine technology (c. 30–70 CE–present)
 Timeline of heat engine technology (Prehistory– present)
 History of robots (Ancient times – present)

Transportation and space exploration

Miscellaneous

Terrorism
 Timeline of terrorist attacks in the United States (1782–present)
 Timeline of the September 11, 2001 attacks (1939–present)
 Timeline for the day of the September 11 attacks (11 September 2001)
 Timeline for September following the September 11 attacks (11–30 September 2001)
 Timeline for October following the September 11 attacks (October 2001)
 Timeline beyond October following the September 11 attacks (November 2001–present)
 Timeline of Earth Liberation Front actions (1997–present)
 Timeline of the 2011 Norway attacks (1999–22 July 2011)
 Timeline of Abu Sayyaf attacks (2000–present)
 Timeline of terrorism in Egypt (2013-present)

See also

 Chronology
 Common Era (explains CE and BCE)
 Dating creation
 Hindu/Vedic chronometry
 Holocene calendar
 New chronology (Fomenko)
 Tamil chronometry
 Timeline
 Templates:
 Human timeline
 Life timeline
 Nature timeline
 Ussher chronology

External links
 ChronoZoom is a timeline for Big History being developed for the International Big History Association by Microsoft Research and University of California, Berkeley
 Asian Studies online: a timeline of major developments
 Alabama Civil War Timeline
 Asian Studies online:timelines data base
 Art of the Wikipedia Nature Timelines (includes: Human timeline; Life timeline; Nature timeline).